Harold Halden Mellor (March 1878 – 1950) was an English footballer who played in the Football League for Crewe Alexandra, Grimsby Town and Stoke.

Career
Mellor was born in Stoke-upon-Trent and started his career with nearby Crewe Alexandra. After two appearances in the League for the "Alex" he returned to the hometown and joined Burslem Port Vale and then Dresden United. He joined Stoke in 1897 and became a regular in the side in a difficult 1897–98 season which saw Stoke finish bottom of the First Division and entering into the end of season test match. Stoke came out victorious albeit in controversial fashion, Stoke and Burnley playing for a 0–0 draw which saw the FA introduce automatic promotion and relegation.

Mellor lost his place in the side to Jack Kennedy in 1898–99 and left for Grimsby Town in 1900. After one season with Grimsby he moved south to Brighton & Hove Albion.

Career statistics
Source:

References

1878 births
Footballers from Stoke-on-Trent
English footballers
Association football forwards
Crewe Alexandra F.C. players
Port Vale F.C. players
Dresden United F.C. players
Stoke City F.C. players
Grimsby Town F.C. players
Brighton & Hove Albion F.C. players
English Football League players
1950 deaths